Dorothy Cowser Yancy is an American academic, professor, and administrator. Her contributions to academia established her legacy of scholarship among African-American women. During college, Yancy participated in civil rights organizations, earned several degrees, including a Ph.D. in political science, and completed the Fulbright Program. She went on to teach at the School of Social Sciences at Georgia Institute of Technology, becoming the first African-American to become a tenured full professor. She left Georgia Tech in 1994 to become the president of Johnson C. Smith University, in Charlotte, North Carolina. In 2009, Yancy became the 14th president of Shaw University and was elected to the position again in 2011 as the 16th president. She received many awards and honors for her dedication to higher education.

Early life 
Dorothy Cowser Yancy was born on April 18, 1944 and raised alongside her 3 siblings on their family-owned farm in Cherokee County, Alabama to parents Howard Cowser and Linnie Bell Covington Cowser. Her parents did not complete school, but they encouraged all of their children to get college degrees. After graduating from the segregated Hatcher High School in 1960, Yancy matriculated to Johnson C. Smith University (JCSU) in Charlotte, North Carolina.

While attending JCSU, she was an active member of the Southern Christian Leadership Conference, Student Nonviolent Coordinating Committee, and the Student Government Association. Yancy also joined Alpha Kappa Alpha, the first historically African-American Greek-lettered sorority. In addition to these groups, she was a participant in the civil rights movement in North Carolina, attending protests in the area.

Originally intending to become a research chemist, Yancy would later discover a passion for history and go on to receive a Master of Arts in History from the University of Massachusetts in 1965, while studying to receive a management development certificate from Harvard University. In 1978, she earned her Ph.D. in political science from Atlanta University on the same weekend as her daughter's kindergarten graduation.

Career 
Yancy served as instructor of history at Albany State College in Albany, Georgia from 1965-1967. She continued teaching history at Hampton Institute in Hampton, Virginia as an instructor from 1965-1967. From 1971-1972, Yancy served as director of the Afro-American Studies program at Barat College in Lake Forest, Illinois. In 1972, Yancy moved to the Georgia Institute of Technology where she served as professor of History, Technology and Society and in the School of Management. Yancy became Georgia Tech's first African-American full professor. In 1988 and 1990, she assisted with labor delegations for the Soviet Union as well as Europe.

In 1994, Yancy became interim president at Johnson C. Smith University, making her the university's first woman president. At JCSU, she helped rebuild Biddle Hall and raised over $145 million for the university, which contributed to her recognition as a financial champion for Historically Black Colleges and Universities (HBCUs). Yancy also started the technology program and in 2000 testified before Congress about technology's importance in higher education. Through her work, applications to JCSU increased, and the United Negro College Fund Technology Initiative was able to lease laptops, computer servers, and hardware for the university through the IBM ThinkPad program. As of 2003, the only historically black institution in the IBM ThinkPad program was Johnson C. Smith University.

Yancy became the first female member of the Central Intercollegiate Athletic Association board (CIAA) and served as its first woman president. She compared her work in the CIAA to being a member of a basketball team where she and the other members must work together for the board to function.

Yancy retired from JCSU in 2008 and began to work with the Federal Mediation and Conciliation Service as an arbitrator and as a consultant in higher education. Yancy appeared before the Committee on Education and Labor on March 13, 2008 to discuss HBCUs, in particular Johnson C. Smith University, and the importance of university funding from the government. In 2009, Yancy became the 14th president of Shaw University and was named to that position again in 2011, after a tornado damaged the campus. During her final tenure at Shaw, she helped the school get five accreditation reviews.

In 2017, she was appointed as senior adviser to the Morehouse College interim president, Harold Martin Jr. by the Morehouse Board of Trustees. Yancy also worked at the Florida Public Employee Relations Commission as Special Master, being the first African American to serve in this position. Throughout her career, she has written more than 40 articles for academic journals such as the Journal of Negro Education and the Labor Studies Journal.

Honors 
Throughout her career, she has garnered multiple awards and honors. Yancy received Outstanding Teacher of the Year from the Georgia Institute of Technology in 1985. In 1988, Newsweek on Campus named her one of the six best teachers in the United States. Yancy was honored in 1980 and 1987 as Who's Who Among African American Women. In 2001, the U.S. Department of State honored Dr. Yancy for being an African American Fulbright Scholar Alumna, after she completed the exchange program in Singapore. One year later in 2002, she was inducted into the Delta of Georgia Chapter of Phi Beta Kappa.

Yancy received the Honorary Alumni Award by the Georgia Tech Alumni Association in 2011. In 2013, she received the Dr. Dorothy I. Height Leadership Award and was listed in the Hall of Fame in Education in "The Atlanta Tribune". The following year she received the Co-Founders Links Award of the 39th Links Assembly. In 2015, WSB-TV recognized her as "a pioneer in higher education". That same year, an information technology building at JCSU was named after her. During a CIAA tournament in 2018, Yancy was recognized by CIAA commissioner, Katrice A. Albert, for her contributions to education and the community.

Personal life 
During her time in high school, Yancy was a member of the varsity basketball team. In 1974, she married Robert James Yancy, who she divorced 25 years later. She has one daughter named Yvonne, her namesake. Yancy now owns the family farm she was raised on and leases it to her brother. In her spare time, she loves to garden, cook, and travel.

Citations

Works Cited 

 
 
 
 
 
 
 
 
 
 
 
 
 
 
  
 
 
 
 
 
 

1944 births
Living people
20th-century American women
21st-century American women
Johnson C. Smith University alumni
Georgia Tech faculty
Clark Atlanta University alumni
University of Massachusetts Amherst alumni
20th-century American people